Railway Club may refer to:

 Railway Club, the oldest continuously operating nightclub in Vancouver, Canada
 The Railway Club, a former society for railway enthusiasts based in London
 Cambridge University Railway Club, for railway fans
 Oxford Railway Club, founded by John Sutro
 Norwegian Railway Club, an association involved in the preservation of Norwegian museum railways

See also
 National Association of Railway Clubs, an association of sports and social clubs in England, Scotland and Wales
 List of model railroad clubs